A raising card is used to raise cloth. Raising is the technique used to produce the nap of cloth. Originally, only woolen cloth was raised, but now flannelette and other cotton fabrics are also raised. Raising is one of the last steps in the finishing process for cloth. It teases out the ends of the fibers in the cloth to produce a nap. 

The raising was first done using the dried fruit pod of a teasel plant, then technology moved on and raising cards were created. A raising card is a brush with metal bristles, similar to hand cards and to the original teasel pod.

The process was mechanized during the industrial revolution, and the raising machine (the Gigmill) looks and works much like the large carding machines, in that it has a large main roller with several small ones positioned around it. The small ones rotate quickly, in either the same direction or opposite of that of the cloth.

After the raising process, the nap is uneven. In order to gain an even surface, the nap is then sheared, or cut, to the desired height.

External links
 Gigmill image

Textile arts